Luciano Rossi (28 November 1934 – 29 May 2005) was an Italian film actor. He appeared in 67 films between 1966 and 1987. He was born and died in Rome, Italy.

Partial filmography

 Ten Italians for One German (1962) - German Soldier at Fosse Ardeatine (uncredited)
 Django (1966) - Klan Member (uncredited)
 Sicario 77, vivo o morto (1966) - Dr. Krauss (uncredited)
 Ramon il Messicano (1966)
 Uno sceriffo tutto d'oro (1966) - Jack
 LSD Flesh of Devil (1967) - Stanis - Gioglu's man
 Bill il taciturno (1967) - Dr. Thompson
 Omicidio per appuntamento (1967) - Massimo Tucci
 Son of Django (1967) - Mack
 The Rover (1967) - Michel
 Halleluja for Django (1967) - Astola
 Death Sentence (1968) - Paco
 Django, Prepare a Coffin (1968) - One of the Hanged
 The Last Chance (1968) - Besive
 Frame Up (1968) - Tippit 
 Run, Man, Run (1968) - Jean-Paul
 Five for Hell (1969) - Johnny 'Chicken' White
 Hate Is My God (1969) - Joe
 The Forgotten Pistolero (1969) - Juanito
 Django the Bastard (1969) - Hugh / Jack Murdok
 Boot Hill (1969) - Sam - the Storekeeper
 Chuck Moll (1970) - Fair Poker Player
 The Conformist (1970)
 I Am Sartana, Trade Your Guns for a Coffin (1970) - Flint Fossit 
 A Man Called Sledge (1970) - The "Wolf" (uncredited)
 They Call Me Trinity (1970) - Timmy / Timid
 Belle d'amore (1970) - Assassino di una prostituta (uncredited)
 Crepa padrone, crepa tranquillo (1970)
 They Call Me Hallelujah (1971) - Ross, Guy trying Violation (uncredited)
 Return of Sabata (1971) - Circus Man Wearing Glasses (uncredited)
 La morte cammina con i tacchi alti (1971) - Hallory
 Jesse & Lester - Due fratelli in un posto chiamato Trinità (1972) - Stage Robber
 Judas... ¡toma tus monedas! (1972) - Imprisoned Bandit
 Rivelazioni di un maniaco sessuale al capo della squadra mobile (1972) - Gastone
 Il terrore con gli occhi storti (1972)
 La morte accarezza a mezzanotte (1972) - Hans Krutzer
 The Sicilian Connection (1972) - Hans
 Death Carries a Cane (1973) - Richard - Silvia's Boyfriend (uncredited)
 Los Amigos (1973) - Moss
 Hospitals: The White Mafia (1973) - Son of a patient
 Donne e magia con satanasso in compagnia (1973)
 Death Smiles at a Murderer (1973) - Franz, Greta's Brother
 Milano trema: la polizia vuole giustizia (1973) - Cruciani
 The Bloody Hands of the Law (1973)
 Ingrid sulla strada (1973) - The traitor
 Giuda uccide il venerdì (1974)
 Il bacio di una morta (1974) - Friend of Andrea
 Silence the Witness (1974) - Antonio - un teppista
 I figli di Zanna Bianca (1974) - Kidnapper #1
 Una donna per 7 bastardi (1974) - Mute
 Commissariato di notturna (1974) - The Polish Sailor
 Prostituzione (1974) - Faustino
 Heroes in Hell (1974) - Kommandant 
 White Fang to the Rescue (1974) - Bailey
 Emanuelle's Revenge (1975) - Card Player (uncredited)
 Violent Rome (1975) - Delivery Man
 Salon Kitty (1976) - Dr. Schwab
 Perché si uccidono (1976)
 Violent Naples (1976) - Quasimodo
 Free Hand for a Tough Cop (1976) - Dealer
 Carioca tigre (1976)
 Le lunghe notti della Gestapo (1977) - Erich Schwab
 Crime Busters (1977) - Geronimo
 I Am Afraid (1977) - The Man with hidden Camera (uncredited)
 Return of the 38 Gang (1977) - Racket boss
 Contraband (1980) - Chemist
 City of the Living Dead (1980) - Policeman in apartment
 Orinoco: Prigioniere del sesso (1980) - Jordan
 The Sword of the Barbarians (1982) - Belem, Village Chief 
 Long Live the Lady! (1987) - Monsieur Pig

References
 Kier-La Janisse: A Violent Professional: The Films of Luciano Rossi. FAB Press, Godalming, 2007

External links

1934 births
2005 deaths
Male actors from Rome
Italian male film actors
Male Spaghetti Western actors
20th-century Italian male actors
People of Lazian descent